Harvey Kimball Hines (1828–1902) was a Methodist minister and an early historian of the U.S. state of Oregon. In 1878 he ran for Congress, and drew criticism for neglecting his religious vows in so doing. He was known, along with Frances Fuller Victor, as a historian who delved through early original documents. Gustavus Hines was his older brother. In 1901 he joined Harvey Whitefield Scott and governor Geer in dedicating a monument to the framers of the Provisional Government of Oregon.

He died at his home in Portland on January 18, 1902. He was initially buried at Lone Fir Cemetery. In autumn that year his remains and those of his wife were removed to the Methodist Lee Mission Cemetery in Salem.

Works 
 Illustrated History of the State of Oregon (1893)
 Illustrated History of the State of Washington (1894)
 At Sea and In Port (1898)
 Missionary History of the Pacific Northwest (1899)

References

Further reading 
 Celinda Elvira Hines; H K Hines; Phoebe Goodell Judson; Gustavus Hines; Joseph Wilkinson Hines: Seven months to Oregon: 1853 diaries, letters and reminiscent accounts, Tooele, Utah: Patrice Press, 2008.

Oregon clergy
1902 deaths
1828 births
Methodist ministers
Historians of Oregon
Place of birth missing
19th-century American clergy